Delaware Township may refer to:

Indiana
 Delaware Township, Delaware County, Indiana
 Delaware Township, Hamilton County, Indiana
 Delaware Township, Ripley County, Indiana

Iowa
 Delaware Township, Sac County, Iowa
 Delaware Township, Delaware County, Iowa
 Delaware Township, Polk County, Iowa

Michigan
 Delaware Township, Michigan

Minnesota
 Delaware Township, Grant County, Minnesota

New Jersey
 Delaware Township, Camden County, New Jersey, now Cherry Hill Township
 Delaware Township, Hunterdon County, New Jersey

Ohio
 Delaware Township, Defiance County, Ohio
 Delaware Township, Delaware County, Ohio
 Delaware Township, Hancock County, Ohio

Pennsylvania
 Delaware Township, Juniata County, Pennsylvania
 Delaware Township, Mercer County, Pennsylvania
 Delaware Township, Northumberland County, Pennsylvania
 Delaware Township, Philadelphia County, Pennsylvania, defunct
 Delaware Township, Pike County, Pennsylvania

Township name disambiguation pages